Dominique Petit (born 5 March 1961) is a French freestyle swimmer. He competed in two events at the 1980 Summer Olympics.

References

External links
 

1961 births
Living people
French male freestyle swimmers
Olympic swimmers of France
Swimmers at the 1980 Summer Olympics
Place of birth missing (living people)
20th-century French people
21st-century French people